Trance Spirits (2002) is the collaborative album by American ambient musicians Steve Roach, Jeffrey Fayman and  guest musicians Robert Fripp and Momodou Kah.

Songs 
The album starts with "Taking Flight," full of repetitive rhythms and themes, percussive groove. The title track, "Trance Spirits", begins with a slow series of rhythms and atmospheres. In the middle of the album, tracks "Off Spring", "Seekers" and "The Calling" are pure ambient soundscapes with percussive edges. "Year of the Horse" has a synthetic and electric rhythm. The final track, "In the Same Deep Water", contains ethereal drone themes with drumming by Fayman and Momodou Kah.

Reception 
AllMusic rated the album 4.5 out of 5, stating that, overall, "The sum total is a different direction for Roach and a deep and even transformational listening journey for anyone who takes the chance."

Track listing

Personnel 
Adapted from Discogs and Bandcamp.

 Ralph Prata – artwork
 Steve Roach, Jeffrey Fayman – composer, mixing, producer
 Sam Rosenthal – cover design
 Steve Roach – guitar & synth soundworlds, shamanic percussion, ocarinas & hybrid grooves
 Roger King – mastering
 Jeffrey Fayman & Momodou Kah – percussion
 Robert Fripp – guitar soundscapes (tracks 1, 6, & 7)

References

External links 
 Trance Spirits at Bandcamp
 Trance Spirits at Discogs

2002 albums
Steve Roach (musician) albums
Projekt Records albums
New-age albums by American artists